Dancers is a  sculpture by Jonathan Borofsky, installed in Denver's Performing Arts Sculpture Park, in the Denver Performing Arts Complex.

References

Dance in art
Outdoor sculptures in Denver
Statues in Colorado